Wilson Deodato da Silva (born January 10, 1981) is a Brazilian football player.

Club statistics

References

External links

J.League

1981 births
Living people
Brazilian footballers
J2 League players
Japan Football League players
FC Ryukyu players
Giravanz Kitakyushu players
ReinMeer Aomori players
FC Osaka players
Brazilian expatriate footballers
Expatriate footballers in Japan
Association football defenders